Cândești is a commune in Botoșani County, Romania. It is composed of four villages: Călinești, Cândești, Talpa, and Vițcani.

Cândești village is located in Bukovina, while the other three are in Western Moldavia.

Natives
 Octav Cozmâncă

References

Communes in Botoșani County
Localities in Southern Bukovina